The 1940 Soviet football championship was the 10th seasons of competitive football in the Soviet Union. Dinamo Moscow won the championship becoming the winner of Group A for the third time.

Honours

Notes = Number in parentheses is the times that club has won that honour. * indicates new record for competition

Soviet Union football championship

Group A

Group B

Top goalscorers

Group A
Grigoriy Fedotov (CDKA Moscow), Sergey Solovyov (Dinamo Moscow) – 21 goals

Republican level
Football competitions of union republics

Football championships
 Azerbaijan SSR – Lokomotiv Baku
 Armenian SSR – Spartak Yerevan
 Belarusian SSR – DKA Minsk (see Football Championship of the Belarusian SSR)
 Estonian SSR – unknown
 Georgian SSR – Dinamo Batumi
 Kazakh SSR – none
 Karelo-Finish SSR – unknown
 Kirgiz SSR – Spartak Frunze
 Latvian SSR – unfinished
 Lithuanian SSR – unknown
 Moldavian SSR – city of Kishinev
 Russian SFSR – none
 Tajik SSR – none
 Turkmen SSR – none
 Uzbek SSR – none
 Ukrainian SSR – Lokomotyv Zaporizhia (see 1940 Football Championship of the Ukrainian SSR)

Football cups
 Azerbaijan SSR – Dinamo Baku
 Armenian SSR – Dinamo Leninakan
 Belarusian SSR – Dinamo Minsk
 Estonian SSR – unknown
 Georgian SSR – unknown
 Kazakh SSR – Dinamo Alma-Ata
 Karelo-Finish SSR – Kem
 Kirgiz SSR – Spartak Frunze
 Latvian SSR – unknown
 Lithuanian SSR – unknown
 Moldavian SSR – unknown
 Russian SFSR – Osnova Ivanovo
 Tajik SSR – Dinamo Stalinabad
 Turkmen SSR – Dinamo Ashkhabad
 Uzbek SSR – Dinamo Tashkent
 Ukrainian SSR – FC Dynamo Dnipropetrovsk (see 1940 Cup of the Ukrainian SSR)

References

External links
 1940 Soviet football championship. RSSSF